Vlastec is a municipality and village in Písek District in the South Bohemian Region of the Czech Republic. It has about 200 inhabitants.

Administrative parts
Villages of Červený Újezdec and Struhy are administrative parts of Vlastec.

References

Villages in Písek District